Jean-Pierre Rocroi is a French malacologist, a scientist, a zoologist who studies mollusks. He works at the Muséum national d'histoire naturelle in Paris.

In 2005, he was the junior author (editor) (with Philippe Bouchet) of a new taxonomy of the class Gastropoda, published in a paper titled "Classification and Nomenclator of Gastropod Families" published in the journal Malacologia. This taxonomy is shown in the Wikipedia article "Taxonomy of the Gastropoda (Bouchet & Rocroi, 2005)".

References

Living people
French malacologists
National Museum of Natural History (France) people
Year of birth missing (living people)